The 15th Rajasthan Legislative Assembly was elected in 2018.

History 
On 19th September 2022 it was reported that Ashok Gehlot was interested in running for the post of Congress president in the 2022 Indian National Congress presidential election. He officially confirmed on the 24th that he will be running for the post.

Post Gehlot announcing his intentions to run for the post, multiple MLA in Rajasthan expressed dissatisfaction. Concerns over the government power in Rajasthan grew within the party, with Pro-Gehlot MLA planning on submitting resignations if Sachin Pilot were to become the CM. On the 29th Gehlot met with Congress president Sonia Gandhi for an hour long meeting, post meeting Gehlot confirmed he will no longer be contesting for the post.

Composition 

 In 2018 BTP supported the Congress government.
 Ramgarh, Rajasthan Assembly constituency became vacant after 2018 election results were cancelled.

 On 16 September 2019, all the six BSP MLAs joined the Congress, thus taking the strength of the Congress to 105 seats in the assembly.
 On 24 October 2019, Congress won Mandawa assembly constituency and RLP retained Khinwsar assembly constituency in the 2019 by-elections held on 21 October 2019 which took their tally to 107 and 3 respectively.
 In July CPM MLA Balwan Poonia pledged his support to Ashok Gehlot government.
 On 23 June 2021, 13 independent MLAs supported CM Gehlot's government.
 In 2021, BTP withdrew support to Congress.

On 2 November 2021, after 2021 by-elections, Congress won Dhariawad constituency bypolls, taking tally of Congress to 108.

Members of Legislative Assembly

See also 
 List of constituencies of Rajasthan Legislative Assembly
 Third Ashok Gehlot ministry

References

External links 
 Rajasthan Lok Sabha Election 2019 Results Website
 Rajasthan Assembly Election 2013 News, Candidates List

 

 
Rajasthan